Kalam Institute of Health Technology or KIHT is a Government of India project supported by the Department of Biotechnology. The institution established in July 2017 is named in honour of A. P. J. Abdul Kalam and is located at Visakhapatnam within the campus of Andhra Pradesh Medtech Zone. The institute was established under Make in India Government programme.

Institution
Kalam Institute of Health Technology is focused on research and development of medical devices and medical technology exports. The Institute is supported by Ministry of Science and Technology.

Programme and research
The institute will provide research and development of medical devices information for Andhra Pradesh Medtech Zone Limited and ties up  with research for The Joanna Briggs Institute and University of Adelaide.

See also
Andhra Pradesh Medtech Zone Limited

References

Universities and colleges in Visakhapatnam
2017 establishments in Andhra Pradesh